Gabriella Qvist (born 26 June 2003) is a Danish female curler and coach.

Teams

Women's

Mixed

Mixed doubles

Record as a coach of national teams

Personal life
Gabriella Qvist is a member of a family of Danish curlers. Her father is a Swedish-Danish curler and coach Mikael Qvist, her mother is Trine Qvist, her brother is Alexander Qvist. The four of them played as a team, winning the Danish Mixed Curling Championship in 2016 and 2017.

References

External links
 
 Qvist, Gabriella | Nordic Junior Curling Tour
 

Living people
2003 births
Danish female curlers
Danish curling champions
Danish curling coaches
Place of birth missing (living people)